The following is a List of Michigan State Historic Sites. The register is maintained by the Michigan State Historic Preservation Office, which was established in the late 1960s after the passage of the National Historic Preservation Act of 1966. Sites marked with a dagger (†) are also listed on the National Register of Historic Places in Michigan. Those with a double dagger (‡) are also designated National Historic Landmarks. As of June 2011, there were more than 2,700 total listings distributed through each of Michigan's 83 counties. In addition, several historical markers have been erected outside of Michigan.



Alcona County

Alger County

Allegan County

Alpena County

Antrim County

Arenac County

Baraga County

Barry County

Bay County

Benzie County

Berrien County

Branch County

Calhoun County

Cass County

Charlevoix County

Cheboygan County

Chippewa County

Clare County

Clinton County

Crawford County

Delta County

Dickinson County

Eaton County

Emmet County

Genesee County

Gladwin County

Gogebic County

Grand Traverse County

Gratiot County

Hillsdale County

Houghton County

Huron County

Ingham County

Ionia County

Iosco County

Iron County

Isabella County

Jackson County

Kalamazoo County

Kalkaska County

Kent County

Keweenaw County

Lake County

Lapeer County

Leelanau County

Lenawee County

Livingston County

Luce County

Mackinac County

Macomb County

Manistee County

Marquette County

Mason County

Mecosta County

Menominee County

Midland County

Missaukee County

Monroe County

Montcalm County

Montmorency County

Muskegon County

Newaygo County

Oakland County

Oceana County

Ogemaw County

Ontonagon County

Osceola County

Oscoda County

Otsego County

Ottawa County

Presque Isle County

Roscommon County

Saginaw County

St. Clair County

St. Joseph County

Sanilac County

Schoolcraft County

Shiawassee County

Tuscola County

Van Buren County

Washtenaw County

Wayne County

Wexford County

Outside Michigan

See also
 National Register of Historic Places listings in Michigan
 List of National Historic Landmarks in Michigan
 List of Michigan State Historic Markers

Sources
 Historic Sites Online. Michigan State Housing Developmental Authority. Accessed June 10, 2011.

References

 

Michigan Historic Sites
State Historic Sites
Landmarks in Michigan
Lime kilns in the United States